Stan Grant (born 30 September 1963) is an Australian journalist, writer and radio and television presenter, since the 1990s. He has written and spoken on Indigenous issues and his Aboriginal identity. He is a Wiradjuri man.

Early years

Grant was born on 30 September 1963 in Griffith, New South Wales, the son of Stan Grant Sr, an elder of the Wiradjuri people and Betty Grant (nee Cameron), born near Coonabarabran, the daughter of a white woman and an Kamilaroi Aboriginal man. The Wiradjuri are an Aboriginal Australian people from the south-west inland region of New South Wales. He spent much of his childhood in inner Victoria where the Wiradjuri also have roots.

Career

Journalism 
Grant has more than 30 years of experience working in broadcast radio and television news and current affairs. He spent several years as a news presenter on the Australian Macquarie Radio Network, Seven, SBS, along with a long-term stint at CNN International as a Senior International Correspondent in Abu Dhabi, Hong Kong and Beijing, before starting with the Australian Broadcasting Corporation (ABC).

1990s–2012
In 1994, as host of the Seven Network current affairs programme Real Life Grant won the Logie Award for Most Popular Current Affairs Programme.

In 2007 he took on the role of co-presenter of the one-hour  SBS World News Australia bulletin, and also presented ABC Local Radio's Indigenous programme Speaking Out. In December 2007, Grant resigned from SBS World News Australia and was replaced by Anton Enus.

In 2009 Grant was appointed UAE correspondent for CNN. Based in CNN's new Abu Dhabi news-gathering and production centre, Grant covered stories from both the UAE and the surrounding region and hosted the programme Prism.

2012: NITV and pay TV
Grant returned to Australia in 2012 to help launch SBS' new National Indigenous Television (NITV) channel, and in 2013 hosted a nightly late night news programme NewsNight for Sky News Australia, which aired weeknights at 11pm. From 2014 he started hosting Sky News Australia's Reporting Live with Stan Grant at 6pm, a nightly news programme reporting on the serious news stories of the day, and in April of that year he hosted Crimes that Shook Australia, a six-part television drama series broadcast on Foxtel.

2015: Viral speech
In 2015 Grant took part in a public debate at the IQ2 stage of The Ethics Centre, with immigration lawyer Pallavi Sinha, Herald Sun columnist Rita Panahi and actor Jack Thompson to argue for or against the topic "Racism is destroying the Australian dream". He told of the impact of colonisation on Indigenous Australians, past and present. He argued that "the Australian Dream" was based upon racism, mentioning his ancestors and others who were forced into institutions and unpaid work. The debate itself was a finalist in the United Nations Association of Australia Media Peace Awards for "its role in stimulating public awareness and understanding".

2017–present
In 2017, Grant joined the ABC as editor of Indigenous Affairs and fill-in host of nightly current affairs programme 7.30. Grant also hosted The Link, which aired on Friday nights.

In 2018 Grant started hosting a flagship national night current affairs programme, Matter of Fact, on the ABC News TV Channel and ABC News Radio. He was also appointed chief Asia correspondent for the ABC News Network. The program was cancelled after 10 months, ending on 29 November 2018, after which time he took up the new role of Indigenous and International Affairs Analyst with the ABC, concurrently with a professorship at Griffith University (see below).

In 2019 Grant moved to Doha, capital city of Qatar, to start work with Al Jazeera English.

In September 2020, it was announced that Grant would become the ABC's International Affairs Analyst with the broadcaster noting his past journalistic experience in China affairs. This was notable as the ABC reporters working in China, Bill Birtles and Mike Smith, were removed from China by the Australian Broadcasting Corporation on advice from the Australian Security and Intelligence Organization, Australia's chief spy agency; the evacuation of the reporters led to a short diplomatic standoff.

In December 2020, Grant hosted a series of episodes about identity for the ABC's long form interview program One Plus One.

In 2021, Grant launched the ABC's China Tonight program – looking at Chinese culture and politics for an Australian audience.

In July 2022, it was announced that Grant will permanently host Q+A from 1 August.

Political views 

Following the death of Queen Elizabeth II in 2022, Grant wrote of his "choking asphyxiating anger at the suffering and injustice my people endure" and argued that History itself "is written as a hymn to whiteness..."

In a February 2023 article defending the ABC's controversial reporting of a community meeting in Alice Springs, Grant described firebrand ex-Greens Senator Lidia Thorpe as an indigenous leader who speaks of "peace, healing, respect and rights".

Academia
In October 2018 Grant was appointed Professor of Global Affairs at Griffith University.

In April 2020 he was appointed Vice-Chancellor's Chair of Australian-Indigenous Belonging at Charles Sturt University, a position he still holds .

Other activities and roles
Grant has been an ambassador of the Australian Indigenous Education Foundation since 2017. Since July 2020, he is a Senior Fellow at the Australian Strategic Policy Institute.  , he is the vice-chancellor's chair of Australian/Indigenous Belonging  at Charles Sturt University.

Books
Grant has authored several works of non-fiction (see below).

Film
Grant wrote, and features in, the full-length documentary film The Australian Dream, released in 2019, the title of which echoes that of his address at the IQ2 debate. The film looks at the part played by racism in the demonisation of Australian Rules football-player Adam Goodes. It won the AACTA Award for best feature documentary in the 2019 series and the 2019 Walkley Documentary Award.

Politics
During early 2016 Grant was talked about as running in the 2016 Australian federal election. Grant ruled out running for the National Party of Australia and said he was not "ideologically bound to the left" and that he admired people with the "small-l liberal" approach".

In mid-March, nine weeks before the 2019 Australian federal election, Grant was asked by the Prime Minister Scott Morrison to a meeting at Kirribilli House. While there he was asked to run for the Liberal Party of Australia, but turned down the offer, saying "It was an honour to be asked by the Prime Minister, but in the end that role is just not for me. I like what I am doing now, totally independently, and I don’t have to make my views fit within a party framework".

Other

Grant gave the Eddie Koiki Mabo Lecture at James Cook University in Townsville on Mabo Day, 3 June 2022, the 30th anniversary of the historic decision ("the Mabo case") that overturned the myth of terra nullius and established the principle of native title in Australia.

Works

Print
The Tears of Strangers 
In 2002, Grant published a memoir, The Tears of Strangers, which details the political and social changes of Indigenous Australians over the period of 40 years, focusing particularly on generations of the Wiradjuri people.

Talking to My Country 
Grant's second book, Talking to My Country, was published in February 2016. The origins of the book came from the abuse of Adam Goodes in 2015. In a review for The Saturday Paper, Talking to My Country was described as "Australia viewed from the riverbank on the edge of town; great affection mixed with discomfort about, 'Advance Australia Fair'" (the national anthem).

The Australian Dream 
The Australian Dream Blood, History and Becoming was published in the Quarterly Essay, November 2016 by Black Inc.

Australia Day
In 2019 Grant published his third book, Australia Day, a follow-up to Talking to My Country about what it means to be Australian.

On Identity 
On Identity was published in both English and Wiradjuri in 2019, in hardcopy and as an e-book. In it Grant "asks why when it comes to identity he is asked to choose between black and white", and "argues that it is time to leave identity behind and to embrace cosmopolitanism" (catalogue blurb).
Tell it to the World
Tell it to the World: An Indigenous Memoir was published in the US in 2019.

 With the Falling of the Dusk

With the Falling of the Dusk, subtitled A chronicle of the world in crisis, was published in 2021.

Talks

The inaugural Gladys Elphick Memorial Oration is scheduled to be given on 17 July 2021 by Grant, as a keynote address of the Adelaide Festival of Ideas and in collaboration with the History Trust of South Australia and Reconciliation SA. The title of the inaugural address is "Flagging Intentions", referring to the Aboriginal flag.

Film
The Australian Dream (2019)

Awards
, Grant has won the following awards:
Peabody Award (US)
DuPont Award (US)
Asian TV Awards (four times)
Walkley Award (three times), including the 2016 Walkley Book Award
The Australian Dream won the AACTA Award for best feature documentary film in the 2019 series and the 2019 Walkley Documentary Award

Personal life
Grant was married to Karla Grant with whom he had three children. A well publicised marriage break-up in 2000, prior to the Sydney Olympic Games, resulted from his starting a relationship with fellow TV journalist Tracey Holmes. After criticism from News Corporation tabloids, while News Corporation was involved in the C7 Sport dispute with Seven, his employment at the Seven Network was terminated as a result, and he and Holmes moved to Hong Kong with CNN. They were there for two years with their baby son, Jesse, before moving to Beijing in mainland China with CNN, totalling 14 years in Asia.

References

Further reading

 

1963 births
Living people
Australian expatriates in the United Arab Emirates
Australian people of Indigenous Australian descent
Wiradjuri people
CNN people
Sky News Australia reporters and presenters
Australian expatriates in Hong Kong
Walkley Award winners